The 1910 United States House of Representatives elections in South Carolina were held on November 8, 1910, to select seven Representatives for two-year terms from the state of South Carolina.  Six incumbents were re-elected and the open seat in the 2nd congressional district was retained by the Democrats.  The composition of the state delegation thus remained solely Democratic.

1st congressional district
Incumbent Democratic Congressman George Swinton Legaré of the 1st congressional district, in office since 1903, defeated James H. Lesesne in the Democratic primary and Republican Aaron P. Prioleau in the general election.

Democratic primary

General election results

|-
| 
| colspan=5 |Democratic hold
|-

2nd congressional district
Incumbent Democratic Congressman James O'H. Patterson of the 2nd congressional district, in office since 1905, was defeated in the Democratic primary by James F. Byrnes.  He was unopposed in the general election.

Democratic primary

General election results

|-
| 
| colspan=5 |Democratic hold
|-

3rd congressional district
Incumbent Democratic Congressman Wyatt Aiken of the 3rd congressional district, in office since 1903, was unopposed in his bid for re-election.

General election results

|-
| 
| colspan=5 |Democratic hold
|-

4th congressional district
Incumbent Democratic Congressman Joseph T. Johnson of the 4th congressional district, in office since 1901, defeated Republican challenger Thomas Brier.

General election results

|-
| 
| colspan=5 |Democratic hold
|-

5th congressional district
Incumbent Democratic Congressman David E. Finley of the 5th congressional district, in office since 1899, won the Democratic primary and was unopposed in the general election.

Democratic primary

General election results

|-
| 
| colspan=5 |Democratic hold
|-

6th congressional district
Incumbent Democratic Congressman J. Edwin Ellerbe of the 6th congressional district, in office since 1901, won the Democratic primary and was unopposed in the general election.

Democratic primary

General election results

|-
| 
| colspan=5 |Democratic hold
|-

7th congressional district
Incumbent Democratic Congressman Asbury Francis Lever of the 7th congressional district, in office since 1901, defeated W.W. Roy in the Democratic primary and Republican R.H. Richardson in the general election.

Democratic primary

General election results

|-
| 
| colspan=5 |Democratic hold
|-

See also
United States House of Representatives elections, 1910
South Carolina gubernatorial election, 1910
South Carolina's congressional districts

References

"Report of the Secretary of State to the General Assembly of South Carolina.  Part II." Reports and Resolutions of the General Assembly of the State of South Carolina. Volume IV. Columbia, SC: 1911, pp. 343–345.

South Carolina
1910
1910 South Carolina elections